Stan Parker (31 May 1920 – 1994) was a professional footballer.

During his career he played as a centre forward for Ipswich Town for whom he was top scorer in their 1949–50 season.

References

1920 births
1994 deaths
Ipswich Town F.C. players
English footballers
Association football forwards